Pleasant Afternoon is an album by organist Charlie Earland which was recorded in 1980 and released on the Muse label in 1981.

Reception

The AllMusic review simply stated "With Houston Person on tenor sax, Bill Hardman on trumpet, and Melvin Sparks on guitar. It was recorded at Englewood Cliffs, NJ.".

Track listing
All compositions by Charles Earland
 "Murilley" – 6:36
 "A Prayer" – 3:46
 "Organic Blues" – 7:31
 "Pleasant Afternoon" – 11:04
 "Three Blind Mice" – 6:16

Personnel
Charles Earland – organ
Bill Hardman – trumpet
Houston Person – tenor saxophone
Melvin Sparks – guitar
Grady Tate – drums
Ralph Dorsey – percussion

References

Muse Records albums
Charles Earland albums
1981 albums
Albums recorded at Van Gelder Studio